Archbishop Marcel Honorat Léon Agboton (born 16 January 1941 in Avrankou) is a retired Beninese Roman Catholic archbishop, the Archbishop Emeritus of Cotonou.

Biography
He was ordained as a priest on 6 January 1966, shortly before his 25th birthday and worked for nearly thirty years in Porto-Novo. On 19 December 1994 he was appointed the first Bishop of Kandi, and on 25 March 1995 was consecrated bishop of that diocese. On 29 January 2000 he was appointed Bishop of Porto-Novo and installed on June 18 the same year. Appointed on 5 March 2005, he was installed Archbishop of Cotonou on 2 April 2005, succeeding Nestor Assogba.

In May 2008 he received a telegram from Pope Benedict XVI on the death of Cardinal Bernardin Gantin. The telegram described Gantin as "an eminent son of Benin and Africa who won great respect within the universal Church". The Pope wrote "I ask God the Father, from Whom all mercy comes, to welcome into His light and peace this eminent son of Benin and of Africa who, universally esteemed, was animated by a profound apostolic spirit and by an exalted sense of the Church and her mission in the world."

His resignation was accepted by Pope Benedict XVI on Saturday 21 August 2010. Bishop Antoine Ganyé of the Roman Catholic Diocese of Dassa-Zoume is his successor as Metropolitan Archbishop of Cotonou.

References

External links

"Archbishop Marcel Honorat Léon Agboton" at Catholic-Hierarchy.org 

Beninese Roman Catholic archbishops
Cotonou
Porto-Novo
1941 births
Living people
Roman Catholic bishops of Kandi
Roman Catholic bishops of Porto Novo
Roman Catholic archbishops of Cotonou